Olivier Claessens (born 22 December 1988 in Edegem) is a Belgian former professional football player (currently playing as amateur). His position on the field is forward and he is currently under contract with Belgian side KFC Baal from the Belgian Provincial Leagues.

Claessens was part of the starting eleven in RC Mechelen's cup successes against Germinal Beerschot and Zulte Waregem. Against Germinal Beerschot, Claessens missed an open goal from a tight angle. In the confrontation with Zulte Waregem, he saw a valid goal disallowed.

External links
Player info at Cerclebrugge.be 
Player info at Footgoal.net 

1988 births
Living people
Belgian footballers
Association football forwards
Royal Antwerp F.C. players
Willem II (football club) players
K.R.C. Mechelen players
Cercle Brugge K.S.V. players
F.C.V. Dender E.H. players
Belgian Pro League players
Challenger Pro League players
People from Edegem
Sportkring Sint-Niklaas players
Footballers from Antwerp Province